Aaron Vale Blackford (18 December 1871 – 31 August 1948) was an American politician from Iowa.

Life 
Aaron Vale Blackford was of Scottish descent. His family could trace its ancestry to Martin Blackford, who emigrated from Scotland in 1751. Martin's son Joseph, grandson Aaron, and great-grandson John were born near Dillsburg, Pennsylvania. John Blackford and his wife Nancy Atland settled in Van Buren County by 1864. Aaron Vale Blackford was born on 18 December 1871. He graduated from Iowa Wesleyan College in 1897, became a teacher for two years, then went into business with his brother, selling farming equipment and cars in Bonaparte. Blackford was also a farmer and vice president of the Bonaparte State Bank.

A thirty second degree Freemason associated with the Order of the Eastern Star, and Knights Templar, Blackford was politically active as well. He served as a school board member in Bonaparte for two decades. Subsequently, he was elected to the first of two terms on the Iowa House of Representatives in 1926. He represented District 2 as a Republican legislator. He won election to the Iowa Senate in 1928, and held the Senate's 2nd district seat until 1933. He died on 31 August 1948, in Bonaparte.

References

American Freemasons
School board members in Iowa
1948 deaths
20th-century American politicians
20th-century American businesspeople
Businesspeople from Iowa
1871 births
People from Van Buren County, Iowa
American bankers
American automobile salespeople
Republican Party Iowa state senators
Republican Party members of the Iowa House of Representatives
American people of Scottish descent
Schoolteachers from Iowa
19th-century American educators
Iowa Wesleyan University alumni
Farmers from Iowa